The Advanced School for Girls was a South Australian State school whose purpose was to prepare girls to qualify for entry to the University of Adelaide. Founded in 1879, the school merged with Adelaide High School in 1907.

History

From its inception, the University of Adelaide welcomed female students, although degrees were not available to females until 1880. At first, the only schools preparing girls to Matriculation level were small private colleges such as Miss Martin's School and Parliament considered that education of women should be on a more structured basis, and the "Education Act of 1875" provided for establishment of a government-funded Advanced School.

The first appointments were for a headmistress and assistant head: Jane Stanes and Edith Cook (both transferred from the Grote Street Model School), followed by Rene-Armand Martin (French). Stanes resigned the following year, ostensibly due to ill-health, and Cook was promoted to head in 1882. A Government regulation, stipulating that the head must be aged 25, had to be waived for her to be appointed, as she was only 20. The Minister of Education (Thomas King) did not approve, but his successor (J. Langdon Parsons) pushed it through.

The school, in the two-storey former residence of Dr. Lambert Butler, Franklin Street, was opened on 7 October 1879 with sixteen students passing the entrance examination. Additional appointments were made in 1880: Madeline Rees George (German), Ellen Thornber (assistant), Kate C. Brown (assistant). By September 1880 the number of students was 92. The following year, there were more applicants than places. By 1882, girls from the school were prominent in the Matriculation results: two of the top nine were from the Advanced School. In 1883, both recipients of the Sir Thomas Elder prize for physiology were students of the Advanced School.

Many criticisms were leveled against the school: that it robbed educated widows of a source of income as tutors; that by conducting an entrance examination and by not conducting junior classes it had an unfair advantage over other schools; and that by offering French and German rather than the more difficult (and essential for University degrees) Latin and Greek, it was gaining an inflated reputation and at the same time robbing talented women of opportunities.

In 1891 a new purpose-built building on Grote Street was completed. The move from Franklin Street enabled the number of students to be raised from 124 to 150. This building still stands today (2016).

Combining with Adelaide High School 
A.S.G. merged with the (co-educational) Adelaide High School in 1907 under headmaster W. J. Adey, later Director of Education.
It took over the three adjacent buildings in Grote street which were previously (from east to west):  Advanced School for Girls, Teachers' Training College, and Grote Street Model School. In 1951 the school divided into the Adelaide Boys' High School and the Adelaide Girls' High School under headmistress M. Veta Macghey BA. MA. Dip. Ed.

Staff
Edith Alice Bowen ( –1932) married George Craig in 1892; appointed assistant 1882
Kate Cormac Brown ( –1891) appointed assistant 1880, then at private school; suicide 1891
Sarah Cargill: appointed head teacher June 1880, ex-Brisbane Grammar School.

Edith Agnes Cook (1859–1942) married Samuel Grau "Sam" Hübbe ( – c. 15 October 1900) in 1885. She was the first female student at Adelaide University, second headmistress of ASG, later of Burnside school. Her daughter, Dr. Edith Ulrica "Rica" Hübbe (1885–1967), was a student
Katherine Dixon Cook ( –1960), sister of Rica Cook, was music teacher until merger with Adelaide High School
Charlotte Jane Ellershaw (1865–1954): pupil teacher in 1882
Madeline E. Rees George ( –1931) : German teacher; in 1880 left to conduct Miss Woolcock's School in North Adelaide, returned 1886 as headmistress, then head of Adelaide High School.
Agnes Marie Johanna Heyne (1871–1958) married Rev. Caspar Dorsch in 1893
Laura Olga Hedwig Heyne (1873–1959) with Advanced School 1900–1908, then Adelaide High.
Caroline Jacob (1861–1940) in December 1897 took over the Misses McMinn's Tormore House School in North Adelaide; she took over Miss Thornber's School in December 1906
Ellen Magdalen Lewis (1848–1934) drawing teacher 1888–1892
René Amand Martin: French master. One of the first appointments, and one of the few males, but may not have taken up position.
Minnietta Maughan ( –1947) married Rev. Thomas McNeil on 6 April 1912. She was a daughter of Rev. James Maughan.
Caroline Ellen "Carrie" Sells (1868–1956) married James Sadler on 18 June 1932. She was  last surviving ASG teacher
Elizabeth Emily Sheppard (1866–1939) pupil teacher 1882.
Jane Sarah "Jeanne" Stanes (1846–1932) married Henry Alfred Doudy (1849–1931) in 1880. She wrote and a book on early Australian history, The Magic of Dawn, credited as "Mrs Henry Doudy".
Ellen Thornber (1851–1947) was daughter of Catherine Maria Thornber (–1894) who in 1855 founded "Mrs. Thornber's School" at Gover (later renamed Thornber) Street, Unley Park. Ellen was second mistress of ASG, then ran her mother's school with two sisters Catherine Maria Thornber (died 1924) and Rachel (died 1930) until December 1906, when it was taken over by Caroline Jacob to become part of Tormore House School.

Notable alumnae
Ada Mary a'Beckett M.Sc. CBE (1872–20 May 1948), née Lambert, biologist, first woman lecturer at Melbourne University.
Dr. Eleanor Allen, psychologist of Adelaide
Ethel Ambrose
Mabel Jewell Baker, head mistress of Walford School, Unley
Graemme Barbour, senior mistress of the Adelaide High School
Dr. Phoebe Chapple
Florence Cooke Mus. Bac.(3 June 1888 – 11 December 1953), a noted violinist and teacher of music
Dr. Constance May Cooper married Arthur Kent Newbery in 1909
Bessie Davidson, an artist of European reputation
Dr. Eulalie Dawson (née Burnard)
Violet de Mole, well known as a teacher of French in Adelaide
Edith Emily Dornwell, in 1885 the first woman graduate in science at Adelaide University; married Lionel Charles Raymond in 1895, and moved to New South Wales
Edith Josephine Gardner married Cuthbert Viner Smith on 2 April 1910
Elsie Hamilton, another gifted musician
Charlotte Harry OBE, married stationer James Leonard Leal in 1911
Florence Haycraft BSc.
Agnes Marie Johanna Heyne BA married Rev. Caspar Dorsch, mother and stepmother of a remarkable family
Ethel Adelaide Hinde née Ayliffe (1868–1944), aka Ethelwyn Hamilton Hinde, founder and Principal of Riverside School
Stella Howchin B.Sc.
Dr. Edith Ulrica "Rica" Hübbe (1885–1967)
Doris Egerton Jones (1889–1973), Sydney author. Wrote novel Peter Piper (1913), and plays The Flaw (a 1923 a collaboration with Emélie Polini) and Governor Bligh (1930) produced by Alan Wilkie.
Dr. Helen Mayo
Dr. Gertrude Mead daughter of Rev. Silas Mead
Dr. Violet Plummer (1887–1890)
E. Dorothea "Dora" Proud DSc., CBE., first winner of the Catherine Helen Spence Scholarship. She married Gordon A. Pavy in 1917
Maude Mary Puddy AMUA, Mus. Bac., pianist, with a reputation in Europe as well as in Australia
Bessie Rischbieth, noted feminist
Susie Solomon BSc.
Agnes Louisa Storrie for 17 years contributed poems to The Australasian. She married John Wilson Kettlewell in 1890
Anna Trudinger BA, missionary to China where she married Rev. William Robertson Malcolm, settled in NZ.
Constance Mary "Connie" Verco married architect Eric Habershon McMichael in 1909
Nellie Walker B.Sc.
Dora Frances Williams (1874 – 13 November 1950)  married Thomas Slaney Poole in 1903
Eva Roubel Williams married Frederick Augustus d'Arenberg, both daughters of the Rev. Francis Williams, a former head master of St. Peter's College
Charlotte Elizabeth Arabella "Lottie" Wright (1867 – 15 March 1951), first woman to gain her BA. at Adelaide University; proprietor and principal, Semaphore (Girls) High School 1890–99; married Frederick A. Graham in Kalgoorlie 1900, secretary WFMA (Women's Foreign Missionary Auxiliary), peace activists Subiaco.

External links
Relevant photographs held by the State Library of South Australia:
Miss J. Staines, first headmistress of the Advanced School for Girls
Mrs Hubbe, second headmistress of the Advanced School for Girls
Miss M. Rees George, headmistress of ASG 1886–1908
Staff of ASG c. 1900. Back row (from left):  Miss M. Maughan, Miss Ethel Holder, Miss Ellen Lewis. Front row (from left): Miss Marion R. George, Miss M. Rees George, Miss C.E. Sells, Miss K. Cooke (Mus Bac.)
Charlotte E. A. Wright, B.A., the first graduate of the Advanced School for Girls
Stella Howchin, B.SC.
Annie M. Clark, B.A.
Maude M. Puddy, Mus. Bac.
Annie Lane, M.A.
Violet M. Plummer, MB, BS.
Eulalia H. Burnard, MB.
Isobel Sanders, B.A.
A group of women graduates (from left) Mary Kirby B.Sc., Susie Solomon B.Sc., Florence Haycraft B.Sc, and Annie Trehy B.Sc., all former students of ASG.
Dr Helen Mayo
Olga G. Mawby
Agnes M. T. Heyne B.A.
C.E. Sells, Senior Mistress at ASG
Euphemia Thodosia Blair, M.A.
Laura Heyne M.A.
Margaret Lipsham B.A.
Ida Viner Smith B.A.
Constance M. Cooper B.Sc. MB.
E. Dorothea Proud, E. Dorothea Proud, daughter of Cornelius Proud and Emily Good. B.A.(1906), D.Sc.(1916), C.B.E.(1917), graduate and former ASG student.
Stella M. Churchward B.Sc
49th anniversary of ASG
Hilda Farsky
Ada Mary Lambert
Elizabeth E. Weld M.B. B.S.
Hilda Blanche Walter M.A.
Graeme M. Barbour M.A., Senior Mistress
Vida M. Wilks B.A.
M. Chapple B.A.
Franziska Kelly, nee Puttmann, Mus. Bac.
Phoebe Chapple B.Sc.
Anna Trudinger B.A.
F.E. Cooke Mus.Bac.
The Proud sisters Three graduates and former ASG students (from left): E. Dorothea Proud (later Mrs Gordon Pavy) B.A. 1906, D.Sc London 1916, C.B.E. 1917; Millicent F. Proud (later Mrs Paul Furrer) M.A. 1915, Dip.Ed London 1922; Katherine L. Proud (later Mrs A. A. Magarey) A.C.U.A. 1910
Edith E. Dornwell
Last students and staff of ASG
Ellen I. Benham B.Sc
Nellie Walker B.Sc
Earliest home of ASG
Dr Edith Ulrica Hubbe, B.A., M.B. B.S., head of ASG
ASG building

References 

Educational institutions established in 1879
Secondary schools in Adelaide
1879 establishments in Australia
1907 disestablishments in Australia
History of Adelaide
Defunct girls' schools in Australia
Defunct schools in South Australia